Govindanallucheri is a village in the Papanasam taluk of Thanjavur district, Tamil Nadu, India.

Demographics 

As per the 2001 census, Govindanallucheri had a total population of 3088 with 1542 males and 1546 females. The sex ratio was 1003. The literacy rate was 65.64.

References 

 

Villages in Thanjavur district